Vögguvísur Yggdrasils ("Yggdrasil's lullabies" in Icelandic) is the fourth full-length studio album by the Icelandic viking/folk metal band Skálmöld, released on September 30, 2016 via Napalm Records.

Track listing

References 

2016 albums
Skálmöld albums
Napalm Records albums